Paul Martin Goodison MBE (born 29 November 1977, Brinsworth, Rotherham, South Yorkshire) is an English Olympic gold medal-winning sailor.

Background
He studied at Southampton Solent University completing an Undergraduate degree in Maritime Studies following his Olympic Degree and Honorary Doctorate in Sport was also issue by Solent University

Sailing career

Laser Class and Olympics
In March 2005, he was ranked 2nd in the world in the Laser, behind Robert Scheidt of Brazil, and ahead of Michael Blackburn of Australia and Mark Mendelblatt of the United States.

He won the gold medal in the Men's Laser class at the 2008 Summer Olympics. In 2009 he won the Laser World Championships, in Halifax, Canada. He also competed in the 2004 Summer Olympics, finishing 4th, and the 2012 Summer Olympics, finishing 7th.

Other World Championships
He has also won the Melges 20 and Melges 32 class World Championships.

Goodison has won the three Moth World Championship starting in 2016 Hayama, Japan and in 2017 won the title a second time in Malcesine, Italy (Lake Garda). and then the 2018 title.

America Cup
Goodison joined Artemis Racing for their 2017 Louis Vuitton Challenger’s Trophy campaign.

He then went to sail for New York Yacht Clubs – American Magic campaign in the 36th America's Cup – Challenger Series where the team capsized compromising there campaign. And has committed to the team for their challenge of the 37th America's Cup.

Awards
Goodison was appointed Member of the Order of the British Empire (MBE) in the 2009 New Year Honours.

Footnotes

External links
 Official website
 

1977 births
Living people
Alumni of Solent University
Olympic sailors of Great Britain
Sailors at the 2004 Summer Olympics – Laser
Sailors at the 2008 Summer Olympics – Laser
Olympic medalists in sailing
Olympic gold medallists for Great Britain
Medalists at the 2008 Summer Olympics
English Olympic medallists
Sailors at the 2012 Summer Olympics – Laser
Laser class world champions
Moth class world champions
Melges 20 class world champions
Melges 32 class world champions
World champions in sailing for Great Britain
Sportspeople from Rotherham
English male sailors (sport)
Members of the Order of the British Empire
Extreme Sailing Series sailors
Artemis Racing sailors
American Magic
2021 America's Cup sailors